Sam Taub (September 10, 1886 – July 10, 1979) was a journalist and radio broadcaster who is best known for his work covering boxing.

Taub was Jewish, and was born on New York's Lower East Side and raised on Mott Street in Chinatown. Taub's first job in journalism was as an assistant to Bat Masterson at the New York Morning Telegraph. He eventually became sports editor of that paper.

In 1924, Taub began his career as a radio boxing announcer. In 1939, he became the first person to announce a major fight for television when he called the Lou Nova-Max Baer bout. He also had a radio show called The Hour of Champions which ran for twenty-four years on WHN in New York.

Taub also worked as a boxing journalist. His contributions were featured in The Ring from the 1920s until his death in the 1970s.

Among the awards Taub received was the James J. Walker Award for "Long and Meritorious Service to Boxing" from the Boxing Writers Association. That same organization created the "Sam Taub Award" for excellence in broadcasting journalism in 1978. He is an inductee of the International Boxing Hall of Fame. Taub received the Pillar of Achievement from the International Jewish Sports Hall of Fame.

References

External links
International Boxing Hall of Fame Biography 

1886 births
1979 deaths
American sports announcers
Boxing commentators
International Boxing Hall of Fame inductees
Jewish American journalists